Prudboy is a rural locality (a settlement) in Marinovskoye Rural Settlement, Kalachyovsky District, Volgograd Oblast, Russia. The population was 798 as of 2010. There are 26 streets.

Geography 
Prudboy is located 31 km east of Kalach-na-Donu (the district's administrative centre) by road. Karpovka is the nearest rural locality.

References 

Rural localities in Kalachyovsky District